Company of Thieves may refer to:

 Company of Thieves (band)
 "Company of Thieves" (Stargate SG-1), episode
 A thieves' guild

See also
 Sly 2: Band of Thieves
 Den of Thieves (disambiguation)
 King of Thieves (disambiguation)
 Company (disambiguation)
 Thief (disambiguation)